Douglas Gilmore (June 25, 1903 – July 26, 1950) was an American actor. He appeared in numerous films and theater productions.

The University of Washington has a photograph of him from 1927.

Filmography

His Buddy's Wife (1925), his film debut
Sally, Irene and Mary (1925)
Dance Madness (1926)
Paris (1926)
Love's Blindness (1926)
The Taxi Dancer (1927)
A Kiss in a Taxi (1927)
Rough House Rosie (1927)
Object: Alimony (1928)
The Spirit of Youth (1929)
The One Woman Idea (1929)
Pleasure Crazed (1929)
Married in Hollywood (1929)
A Song of Kentucky (1929)
Cameo Kirby (1930)
The Big Party (1930)
Hell's Angels (1930)
The Naughty Flirt (1930)
 Desert Vengeance (1931)
Unfaithful (1931)
The Girl Habit (1931)
The Crane Poison Case (1932) (short)

References

External links

Douglas Gilmore at IBDb.com

kinotv.com
Douglas Gilmore (Aveleyman)
Gilmore and Joan Crawford, dancing(archived)
Gilmore and Jean Harlow, Hell's Angels(archived)

1903 births
1950 deaths
American male film actors
American male silent film actors
20th-century American male actors
American male stage actors
Male actors from Boston
People from Massachusetts